Dan Alvaro (born Rolando Galura 1951) is a Filipino actor both in movies and television. His niece is actress Glaiza de Castro and his nephew is actor Alcris Galura. He is the father of actor Ram Alvaro.

Career

In 1984, Alvaro played as the brother of Nora Aunor in the movie Condemned who works as a driver and hired hit man for ruthless money laundering lady played by Gloria Romero. He received a nominations for PMPC Star Awards for Movies for New Male Movie Star of the Year and Movie Actor of the Year in the movie Condemned. In 1986, he launched to action stardom in the movie Bagong Hari, which he received also a nominee for Best Actor Gawad Urian Award, directed by Mario O'Hara under Cine Suerte productions. 
He played the title role in supernatural hero movie Alamid (Ang Alamat) as the younger Alamid (with Lito Lapid as the elder Alamid).

Filmography

Television
357 Kamagong (1988) Radio Philippines Network
Sa Dulo ng Walang Hanggan  (2001) ABS-CBN Network
Panday  (2005) ABS-CBN Network
Amaya  (2011) GMA Network
Indio (2013) GMA Network
Wish Ko Lang (2015) GMA Network
Buena Familia (2015) GMA Network
Alisto! (2015) GMA Network
Imbestigador (2015) GMA Network
Maynila (2015) GMA Network
Karelasyon (2015) GMA Network
FPJ's Ang Probinsyano (2015) ABS-CBN

Film

References

External links

1951 births
Living people
Filipino male film actors
Place of birth missing (living people)